Frame by Frame: The Essential King Crimson is a 4-CD box set by the band King Crimson, released in 1991.

Track listing

Disc 1: 1969-1971
"21st Century Schizoid Man" (Robert Fripp, Michael Giles, Greg Lake, Ian McDonald, Peter Sinfield) - 7:20
"I Talk to the Wind" (McDonald, Sinfield) - 6:05
"Epitaph" (Fripp, Giles, Lake, McDonald, Sinfield) - 8:44
"Moonchild" (Fripp, Giles, Lake, McDonald, Sinfield) - 2:26
Abridged version, omitting the improv section of the song
"The Court of the Crimson King" (McDonald, Sinfield) - 9:25
"Peace: A Theme" (Fripp) - 1:16
"Cat Food" (Fripp, McDonald, Sinfield) - 2:45
Single version
"Groon" (Fripp) - 3:31
Previously unreleased on CD; also featured on the 2-LP compilation A Young Person's Guide to King Crimson (1976)
"Cadence and Cascade" (Fripp, Sinfield) - 4:10
New mix, replacing Gordon Haskell's original vocals with vocals performed by Adrian Belew, July 1991
"The Sailor's Tale" (Fripp) - 7:27
Abridged version, removing approximately 3.5 seconds' worth of the cymbal introduction
"Ladies of the Road" (Fripp, Sinfield) - 5:31
"Bolero" (Fripp, Sinfield) - 6:45
New mix, replacing Gordon Haskell's original bass guitar with bass guitar performed by Tony Levin, June 1991

Tracks 1-5 from In the Court of the Crimson King (1969)
Tracks 6-7 & 9 from In the Wake of Poseidon (1970)
Tracks 7-8 released as the single "Cat Food/Groon" in 1970
Track 12 from Lizard (1970)
Tracks 10-11 from Islands (1971)
Total Running Time - 67:47

Disc 2: 1972-1974
"Larks' Tongues in Aspic (Part I)" (Bill Bruford, David Cross, Fripp, Jamie Muir, John Wetton) - 10:53
Abridged version
"Book of Saturday" (Fripp, Richard Palmer-James, Wetton) - 2:53
"Easy Money" (Fripp, Palmer-James, Wetton) - 7:55
"Larks' Tongues in Aspic (Part II)" (Fripp) - 7:09
"The Night Watch" (Fripp, Palmer-James, Wetton) - 4:40
"The Great Deceiver" (Fripp, Palmer-James, Wetton) - 4:03
"Fracture" (Fripp) - 6:57
Abridged version
"Starless" (Bruford, Cross, Fripp, Palmer-James, Wetton) - 4:38
Abridged version
"Red" (Fripp) - 6:17
"Fallen Angel" (Fripp, Palmer-James, Wetton) - 5:59
"One More Red Nightmare" (Fripp, Wetton) - 7:09

Tracks 1-4 from the album Larks' Tongues in Aspic (1973)
Tracks 5-7 from the album Starless and Bible Black (1974)
Tracks 8-11 from the album Red (1974)
Total Running Time - 69:08

Disc 3: 1981-1984
All tracks on disc 3 written by Adrian Belew, Bruford, Fripp and Tony Levin, unless otherwise indicated.

"Elephant Talk" - 4:42
"Frame by Frame" - 5:08
"Matte Kudasai" - 3:48
"Thela Hun Ginjeet" - 6:26
"Heartbeat" - 3:54
"Waiting Man" - 4:22
"Neurotica" - 4:48
"Requiem" - 6:36
"Three of a Perfect Pair" - 4:11
"Sleepless" - 5:22
"Discipline" - 5:05
"The Sheltering Sky" - 8:16
"The King Crimson Barber Shop" (Levin) - 1:31
Also featured on the compilation Heartbeat: The Abbreviated King Crimson (1991), subsequently featured on the reissued version of the album Three of a Perfect Pair (1984)

Tracks 1-4 & 11-12 from the album Discipline (1981)
Tracks 5-8 from the album Beat (1982)
Tracks 9-10 from the album Three of a Perfect Pair (1984)
Total Running Time - 64:08

Disc 4: Live 1969-1984
"Get Thy Bearings" (Donovan Leitch) - 9:21
Recorded at Plumpton Racetrack (at the Ninth National Jazz and Blues Festival), Streat, UK, 9 August 1969
subsequently featured on the live album (4-CD set) Epitaph
"Travel Weary Capricorn" (Fripp, Giles, Lake, McDonald, Sinfield) - 4:23
Recorded at Plumpton Racetrack (at the Ninth National Jazz and Blues Festival), Streat, UK, 9 August 1969
Subsequently featured on the live 4-CD set Epitaph (1997)
"Mars" (Gustav Holst) - 8:09
Recorded at the Fillmore West, San Francisco, California, United States, 14 December 1969*
subsequently featured on the live 4-CD set Epitaph
"The Talking Drum" (Bruford, Cross, Fripp, Muir, Wetton) - 8:30
Recorded at the Concertgebouw, Amsterdam, the Netherlands, 23 November 1973; 
subsequently featured on the live 2-CD set The Night Watch (1997)
"21st Century Schizoid Man" (Fripp, Giles, Lake, McDonald, Sinfield) - 9:15
Recorded at the Concertgebouw, Amsterdam, the Netherlands, 23 November 1973
subsequently featured on the live 2-CD set The Night Watch
"Asbury Park" (Bill Bruford, Cross, Fripp, Wetton) - 6:52
Recorded at the Casino, Asbury Park, New Jersey, 28 June 1974; previously featured on the live album USA (1975)
"Larks' Tongues in Aspic (Part III)" (Belew, Bruford, Fripp, Levin) - 2:35
recorded at Le Spectrum, Montreal, Quebec, Canada, 11 July 1984; excerpt version from the afternoon show. A complete performance from the evening show was subsequently featured on the live 2-CD set Absent Lovers: Live in Montreal (1998)
"Sartori in Tangier" (Belew, Bruford, Fripp, Levin) - 4:08
recorded at Le Spectrum, Montreal, Quebec, Canada, 11 July 1984
subsequently featured on the live album (2-CD set) Absent Lovers: Live in Montreal
"Indiscipline"  (Belew, Bruford, Fripp, Levin) - 5:26
Recorded at the Arena, Fréjus, France, 27 August 1982; subsequently featured on the live album (King Crimson Collectors' Club release) Live at Cap D'Agde (April 1999)
Total Running Time - 61:20

(*) The Frame by Frame booklet incorrectly lists the date as 10 December 1969.

References

1991 compilation albums
King Crimson compilation albums